The  was a weekly musical review founded in 1827 by the Belgian musicologist, teacher and composer François-Joseph Fétis, then working as professor of counterpoint and fugue at the Conservatoire de Paris. It was the first French-language journal dedicated entirely to classical music. In November 1835 it merged with Maurice Schlesinger's Gazette musicale de Paris (first published in January 1834) to form Revue et gazette musicale de Paris, first published on 1 November 1835. It ceased publication in 1880.

History
By 1830 the Revue musicale, written and published by Fétis, was on sale at Maurice Schlesinger's music seller's premises. Schlesinger (whose father founded the Berliner allgemeine musikalische Zeitung) was a German music editor who had moved to Paris in 1821. Schlesinger published editions of classical and modern music under his own name at a reasonable price, most notably works by Mozart, Haydn, Weber, Beethoven, Hummel and Berlioz. He also published Robert le diable and Les Huguenots by Giacomo Meyerbeer, as well as La Juive by Fromental Halévy. Schlesinger founded his own rival publication, the Gazette Musicale de Paris, which first appeared on 5 January 1834.

Another music journal, Le Ménestrel, had first appeared the previous month on 1 December 1833. Until La Revue et Gazette ceased publication in 1880, Le Ménestrel was to be its main rival in terms of influence and breadth of coverage.

In 1835, Schlesinger bought the Revue musicale from Fétis and merged the two journals into the Revue et gazette musicale de Paris.

The name Revue musicale returned for six months in 1839 as the Revue musicale, journal des artistes, des amateurs et des théatres while the journal was a bi-weekly publication. The list of contributors to the Revue et gazette musicale in 1840 included: François Benoist, Hector Berlioz, Castil-Blaze, Antoine Elwart, Stephen Heller, Jules Janin, Jean-Georges Kastner, Léon Charles François Kreutzer, Franz Liszt, Édouard Monnais (director of the Paris Opera from 1839 to 1847), Joseph d'Ortigue, Theodor Panofka, Ludwig Rellstab, Georges Sand, Robert Schumann and Richard Wagner.

The French-language monthly magazine Revue des deux Mondes, founded in July 1829, also featured a section named "Revue musicale".

Publication chronology, 1827—1850
Revue musicale
First series (6 volumes) - published monthly by Fétis. 
Vol. 1 (1827-8) Première année – Tome I
Vol. 2 (1828) Première année – Tome II
Vol. 3 (1828) Tome III 
Vol. 4 (1829) Deuxième année – Tome IV
Vol. 5 (1829) Troisième année – Tome V
Vol. 6 (1830) Quatrième année – Tome VI (ending January 1830)

Second series (9 volumes) - published weekly on Saturdays by Fétis. 
 Vol. 7 (Deuxième serie, Tome premier) (6 February–1 May  1830) 
Vol. 8 (Deuxième serie, Tome second) (8 May–7 August 1830)
Vol. 9 (Deuxième serie, Tome troisième) (14 August–6 November 1830)
 Vol. 10 (13 November 1830 – 29 January 1831) 
Vol. 11 (Tome XI - Vme année: 5 February 1831 – 28 January 1832) 
Vol. 12 (Tome XII - VIme année: 4 February 1832 – 26 January 1833)
 Vol. 13 (1833) (Tome XIII - VIIme année)
 Issue No. 1, 2 February 1833
 Issue No. 48, 28 December 1833
 Vol. 14 (Tome XIV - VIIIme année)
 Issue No. 1, 5 January 1834
 Issue No. 52, 28 December 1834
 Vol. 15 (IXme année: 4 January 1835 – 27 December 1835) Published on Sundays

Gazette musicale de Paris
Published weekly by Schlesinger on Sundays.
 1834, Vol. 1 (First edition, 1ère année, No. 1, Sunday 5 January 1834)
 1834, Vol. 2 (1ère année, No. 27, 6 July 1834) 
 1835, Vol. 1 (2e année, No. 2, 11 January 1835). In issue 44, pp. 353–4 (the first edition of Revue et Gazette Musicale de Paris) Schlesinger - comparing himself to a general of Ancient Greece - announced on 1 November 1835 in glowing terms that the struggle with Fétis had been won, and that La Revue Musicale would pass, with arms and baggage-train, ensigns flying and with all the honours of war, into the Gazette musicale. Fétis announced that subscribers to his Revue would receive the Gazette under the Revue's masthead until 1 January 1836, and that he would continue to write exclusively for the Gazette.
 1835, Vol. 2 (Nos. 45-52, November–December 1835, with supplements)
 Revue et gazette musicale de Paris
Appeared on Sundays.
3rd year, 1836
4th year, 1837
5th year, 1838
 6th year, 1839. From January 1839 until 11 April 1841 the journal appeared twice weekly, on Thursdays and Sundays. For the first six months, (January–June 1839), the Thursday edition appeared as 
Revue musicale, journal des artistes, des amateurs et des théatres with similar font and masthead design. The first edition appeared on Thursday, 3 January 1839, with consistent volume numbering, as 6e année, No. 1.
Revue musicale, journal des artistes etc. (Thursdays only: No. 1, Thursday, 3 January 1839 to No. 26, Thursday, 27 June 1839, as Revue Musicale: plus No 27, Thursday, 4 July, and No. 28, Sunday, 7 July, as Revue et Gazette Musicale de Paris) The Sunday edition continued as 
Revue et gazette musicale de Paris, 6th year, 1839 (6e année, No. 1). (Sundays only: No. 1, Sunday, 6 January until No. 26, Sunday, 30 June; then No 27, Thursday, 4 July, and No. 28, Sunday, 7 July as above; then both Thursday and Sunday editions until No. 72, Sunday 29 December.)
7th year, 1840 (Contains both Thursday and Sunday editions of Revue et Gazette Musicale de Paris)
8th year, 1841 (bi-weekly until issue of 11 April 1841, p. 225, then Sundays only from 18 April)
9th year, 1842
10th year, 1843
 1844 Changes to masthead design and layout. (supplement to 7 January issue contains facsimiles of hundreds of signatures of composers and musicians).
1845
1846
Schlesinger sold the journal in 1846 to a former employee, Louis Brandus.
1847 Reverts to old masthead & layout.
1848 (Google books)
1849
1850
etc. until 1880
The journal was suspended from September 1870 to September 1871 during the Siege of Paris, bringing the Franco-Prussian War to an end.

References 
Notes

External links
La Revue et gazette musicale de Paris, review of the 13-volume edition by Doris Pyee-Cohen and Diane Cloutier, 1999; and its complete Introduction; Répertoire international de la presse musicale (RIPM)
Revue et gazette musicale from 1834 to 1880 at the Internet Archive

1827 establishments in France
1880 disestablishments in France
Classical music magazines
Defunct magazines published in France
French-language magazines
Music magazines published in France
Weekly magazines published in France
Magazines established in 1827
Magazines disestablished in 1880
Magazines published in Paris
Music criticism